, released as Super Bust-A-Move in Europe and North America, is a puzzle video game in the Puzzle Bobble series. It was developed by Taito, and released on November 27, 2000 by Acclaim Entertainment for the PlayStation 2, and by CyberFront and EON Digital Entertainment for Windows in 2001. It was later ported to the Game Boy Advance that same year, the Japanese version under the name . This compilation includes a few graphical enhancements.

The game is a direct port, except for the inclusion of new backgrounds and remixed music. It also features new box artwork, more in line with the in-game artwork.

It is the first mainstream game in the series not to see an arcade release, although there is an arcade game with the same title, which is a completely different game to this one.

Gameplay
Super Puzzle Bobble gameplay is essentially the same as the rest of the series. It bestows some audiovisual improvements, adds and removes gameplay elements, adds a new art style, and adds a new character roster. It has single player, training, computer competition, and two player competition modes. New to this game are large-sized bubbles and a two player cooperation mode, in which players work together to solve a stage.

The GameCube All-Stars version has a four player option and a Space Invaders-style mode called "Shoot Bubble".

Promotion
The game was showcased at the February 1999 AOU Amusement Expo in Japan.

Reception

The PlayStation 2 and Game Boy Advance versions received "generally favorable reviews", while Bust-A-Move 3000 received "mixed" reviews, according to the review aggregation website Metacritic. In Japan, Famitsu gave it a score of 28 out of 40 for the PS2 version, 24 out of 40 for the Game Boy Advance version, and 26 out of 40 for the All-Stars edition.

Ryan Davis of GameSpot said the PS2 version has the best graphics and sound of the series to date, "with extraordinarily sharp 2D graphics and a healthy amount of visual splendor", but that its gameplay represents an "incredibly stripped-down" disappointment to the series which "brings virtually nothing new to the franchise" and is missing a lot of features from the previous year's Bust-a-Move 4. As for BAM3000, there was nothing new and the analog controls were awkward, but the multiple gameplay modes kept players happy. Geraint Evans of NGC Magazine regarded the game as worth owning, but only on one console. Tom Russo of NextGen found the Japanese PS2 import a bit disappointing and no different from the original game.

The PlayStation 2 version was a runner-up for "Puzzle Game of 2000" in Editors' Choice, but won the same award in Readers' Choice at IGNs Best of 2000 Awards for PlayStation 2.

Notes

References

External links

GameSpy Top Ten list

2000 video games
Acclaim Entertainment games
Bubble Bobble
CyberFront games
Game Boy Advance games
GameCube games
Mobile games
Multiplayer and single-player video games
PlayStation 2 games
Puzzle video games
Taito games
Ubisoft games
Video games developed in Japan
Windows games
Eon Digital Entertainment games